Väinö Rantala (born 28 August 1941) is a Finnish wrestler. He competed in the men's freestyle flyweight at the 1960 Summer Olympics.

References

External links
 

1941 births
Living people
Finnish male sport wrestlers
Olympic wrestlers of Finland
Wrestlers at the 1960 Summer Olympics
People from Ylivieska
Sportspeople from North Ostrobothnia